Saturday Night Engine may refer to:

Saturday Night Engine, a 1995 album recorded by Broder Daniel
"Saturday Night Engine", a 2003 single recorded by Club 8